The Iraq national baseball team is the national baseball team of Iraq. The team represents Iraq in international competitions. 

The team is controlled by the Iraqi Baseball and Softball Federation, which is a member of the Baseball Federation of Asia since .

References

National baseball teams in Asia
Baseball